The Forty-Fours are a group of islands in the Chatham Archipelago, about  east of the main Chatham Island. They are called Motchuhar in Moriori and Motuhara in Māori.

The region is one of only two breeding sites for the Chatham fulmar prion.  It has been identified as an Important Bird Area by BirdLife International due to it also supporting colonies of Buller's and northern royal albatrosses.

See also

 Desert island
 List of islands

References

Islands of the Chatham Islands
Uninhabited islands of New Zealand
Important Bird Areas of the Chatham Islands
Seabird colonies
Extreme points of New Zealand